HMS Buckingham was a 70-gun third rate ship of the line of the Royal Navy, built by Richard Stacey at Deptford Dockyard to the 1719 Establishment, and launched on 13 April 1731.

In 1740 she was under command of Captain Cornelius Mitchell.

She took part in the Battle of Toulon (1744).

Buckingham served until 1745 when she was broken up.

Notes

References

Lavery, Brian (2003) The Ship of the Line - Volume 1: The development of the battlefleet 1650-1850. Conway Maritime Press. .

Ships of the line of the Royal Navy
1730s ships